The Alabama Law Enforcement Agency, abbreviated as "ALEA", is a law enforcement agency serving the U.S. state of Alabama. It exists within the Executive Branch of State Government to coordinate public safety in Alabama. It was formed on 1 January 2015 by the merger of 12 state law enforcement agencies. The Secretary, its chief executive, is appointed by and serves at the pleasure of the Governor of Alabama. ALEA is divided into two functional divisions, the Department of Public Safety and the State Bureau of Investigations. The Secretary of ALEA is responsible for appointing a Director of both divisions, after consultation with the Governor.

Mission

Mission Statement 
The Mission of the Alabama Law Enforcement Agency is to efficiently provide quality service, protection, and safety for the State of Alabama through the utilization of consolidated law enforcement, investigative, and support services.

History

Creation 
The creation of ALEA was proposed by Senator Del Marsh and others in Senate Bill 108 (SB108) during the 2013 regular session of the Alabama Legislature. The bill passed both houses and was signed by then Governor Robert Bentley on 19 March 2013 as Act 2013-67 and codified in the Code of Alabama 1975, Title 41 - State Government, Chapter 27 - Alabama State Law Enforcement Agency.

According to Senator Marsh, the intent of SB108 was to operate public safety "...in a more efficient, cost-effective way.” This bill and its proposed consolidation of preexisting state-level law enforcement agencies (Legacy Agencies) was based on recommendations of a Public Safety Study Group created in 2012 to streamline the state's 22 agencies with law enforcement functions and cut spending.

Legacy Agencies 

 Alabama Department of Homeland Security
 Alabama Department of Public Safety
 Alabama Bureau of Investigation 
Alabama Fusion Center
Alabama Criminal Justice Information Center
 Alabama Marine Police
Alabama Alcoholic Beverage Control Board Enforcement 
Alabama Department of Revenue Enforcement
Alabama Forestry Commission Investigations
Alabama Agricultural and Industry Investigations 
Alabama Public Service Commission Enforcement
Alabama Office of Prosecution Service Computer Forensics Lab

List of ALEA Secretaries 

 Hal Taylor
 12 April 2017 - Present
 Stan Stabler
 17 February 2016 - 12 April 2017
 Spencer Collier
 5 April 2013 - 22 March 2016

See also

 List of law enforcement agencies in Alabama
 State police
 Highway patrol

References

External links
Alabama Law Enforcement Agency official website

State law enforcement agencies of Alabama
Government agencies established in 2015
2015 establishments in Alabama